Alfred Lenglet (born in 1968, Caudry), is a French chief superintendent and novelist specialised in crime fiction. who grew up in Bertry. He was awarded the Lucien Gachon Prize in 2003 for his book 'The Hollow of Hell' (French: Le Creux de l'Enfer).

Biography 
After graduating from the Prytanée national militaire and the Aix-en-Provence military school, he joined the National Police where he became a divisional commissioner, chief superintendent, departmental director of the police forces in France like in Auvergne or Burgundy and 'Head of the Night Service' in Lyon. In 2018, he was appointed professor to the French National Policing School in Saint-Cyr-au-Mont-d'Or. Lenglet holds a master's degree in History writing a thesis on the Parisian police before the First World War convened by Jean-Paul Brunet. His writings reflect his upbringing in northern France impacted by the Great War, his military training and his readings of specific authors such Guy de Maupassant, Ernst Jünger, Marguerite Yourcenar, Henri Bosco, Jean d'Ormesson and Julien Gracq. The recurring character he created is named Léa Ribaucourt, a young policewoman.

Non-exhaustive bibliography

Personal life 
Lenglet had four children with Nathalie Vrech named Erwin, Nils, Nanncy and Mancia.

References 

French male novelists
20th-century French novelists
21st-century French novelists
20th-century French male writers
21st-century French male writers
1968 births
Living people